Wong Wo Bik is a fine arts photographer and one of the few active female photographers in Hong Kong. She is best known for her photographic documentation of buildings and architecture with historical and cultural significance in Hong Kong. Her work also involves artistic manipulations, as these photographs retell her experience and stories at the sites. In 2013, she received an award from the Hong Kong Women Excellence in the Six Arts, Hong Kong Federation of Women. Wong also has a long and active career as a curator, researcher and art educator.

Early life 
Born in Hong Kong, Wong Wo Bik received her Bachelor of Fine Arts in sculpture and printmaking at the Columbus College of Art and Design, Ohio, US in 1977 and Master of Fine Arts in Photography from the Tyler School of Art, Temple University, Philadelphia, US in 1979. She currently lives and works in Hong Kong.

Life as a photographer

History and memory 
She began her photography career in the 1980s, capturing photographs of historical architecture and landscapes in Hong Kong. Instead of preserved heritage buildings, she is interested in exploring old buildings that may be destroyed or demolished as time goes by.
Her works are not just a historical record of old buildings but a reflection of her own experience "vanquishing time and space" at the site. She tries to use art as a way for her to express and shed perspective on these various destinations because she believes that the architecture she sees around the streets of Hong Kong reveals stories about the people who lived there. Through artistic fabrications, by only setting up two lights and flaw angles, she attempts to reinvent and retell these stories as well as her own subjective narrative of her experiences during her exploration at the site.

Directional photography 
Wong becomes interested in the missing images after one of her friends told her that she remembers seeing a family photo taken back in the 1930s but had been lost. Photography, to her, is not an instrument of memory but also a tool for the invention of memory. At the Woman Wanted exhibition at the Hong Kong Heritage Museum, she display the photograph reconstructed by her in a way that she recruits her friends to simulate the original in the 1930s. She also create the Polaroid series to simulate crime scene in a still frame in a way that mimic thriller film.

Light and meaning 
Wong has her persistent interest in spatial and temporal exchange. Her work uses light, coming in through different forms and materials and with space and non-space to symbolise transitions from the known to the unknown, especially for the photography taken during her travel journey. Viewers of the work tend to turn around the work having their focuses unknowingly shifted.

Advisory and education 
Wong is also one of the founding members of Hong Kong International Photo Festival (Hong Kong Photographic Culture Association), and has been the Museum Honorary Advisor for the Leisure and Cultural Services Department since 1996.

Wong had also taught photography and communication at Hong Kong Arts Centre and multiples universities in Hong Kong, such as The University of Hong Kong and The Chinese University of Hong Kong and worked as a researcher at Hong Kong Heritage Museum.

Awards and achievements 
1975–77 Columbus College of Art and Design – College Grant
1977–79 Tyler School of Art, Temple University – Fellowship and Scholarship
1994 Asian Cultural Council – Fellowship
1995 International Institute of Education – Fellowship on Chinese Women Leadership Programme
2010 The Certificate of Commendation from the Secretary of Home Affairs, Hong Kong
2013 Hong Kong Women Excellence in the Six Arts, Hong Kong Federation of Women

Exhibitions

Solo exhibitions 
1981  "Colour Images", Hong Kong Arts Centre (Presented by the Polaroid Far East Limited), Hong Kong
1985  "Photography Exhibition by Wong Wo Bik", USIS American Library, Hong Kong
1986  "Impression", Alliance Francaise de Hong Kong, Hong Kong
1988  "Plastic Motion", a photo-installation collaborating with a dance performance aurelo, City Contemporary Dance Company’s gallery and theatre, Hong Kong
2009  "Seized Moments: The Photographic Journey of Wong Wo Bik", Hong Kong Fringe Club (Organized by Asia One Product & Publishing Limited), Hong Kong
2011 "Memory and Fiction", Blindspot Gallery, Hong Kong
2014 "Not Just a Fashion Parade", Lumenvisum, Hong Kong
2017 "City of Exchange: Liverpool/Hong Kong", Open Eye Gallery, Liverpool, UK, as part of the Liverpool International Photography Festival

Group exhibitions 
 1978 "East Coast Consortium", Tyler School of Art, Temple University, USA
 1992 – City Vibrance, Hong Kong Museum of Art

Collections 

Archive of Modern Conflict, London, UK
Guangdong Museum of Art, Guangzhou, China.
Hong Kong Heritage Museum
Hong Kong M+ Museum

Publications 

Wong Wo Bik (1983). Color & Consent. Polaroid Far East (HK) Limited.

References

External links
Examples of Wong's photography from Blindspot Gallery
Wong Wo Bik's website

Hong Kong photographers
Living people
Chinese women photographers
Hong Kong people
Temple University Tyler School of Art alumni
Hong Kong women photographers
Year of birth missing (living people)